The First Set is a live album by saxophonists Eddie "Lockjaw" Davis and Johnny Griffin recorded at Minton's Playhouse in 1961 and released on the Prestige label. The album was the second release from the recordings at Minton's after The Tenor Scene.

Track listing 
 "Billie's Bounce" (Charlie Parker) - 8:43    
 "Epistrophy" (Thelonious Monk, Kenny Clarke) - 7:17    
 "Well, You Needn't" (Monk) - 8:58
 "I'll Remember April" (Gene de Paul, Patricia Johnston, Don Raye) - 8:05

Personnel 
 Eddie "Lockjaw" Davis, Johnny Griffin - tenor saxophone
 Junior Mance - piano
 Larry Gales - bass
 Ben Riley - drums

References 

1960 live albums
Eddie "Lockjaw" Davis live albums
Johnny Griffin live albums
Albums produced by Esmond Edwards
Prestige Records live albums